Chait, also transliterated as Khait, is a Jewish family name, from  Hebrew , “tailor”. Notable people with the surname include:

Arkady Khait, Soviet comedy and script writer
Baruch Chait, Jewish religious composer and author
Galit Chait, Israeli ice dancer
Jonathan Chait, American columnist and political writer
Lawrence G. Chait, American advertising executive who was a pioneer in mail-order sales

Hebrew-language surnames
Occupational surnames